Hembrow is a surname. Notable people with the surname include:

David Hembrow, Dutch cycling advocate
David Hembrow (swimmer) (born 1947), British swimmer
Mark Hembrow (born 1955), Australian actor